Miss Mega Bintang Indonesia (previously Miss Grand Indonesia) is a national beauty pageant in Indonesia that currently selects the winners to represent Indonesia in two international beauty pageants namely Miss Grand International and Miss Face of Humanity. Since 2020, The president of Miss Mega Bintang Indonesia Organization (Yayasan Dunia Mega Bintang) is Ivan Gunawan, Indonesian designer and entertainer. The first Miss Grand Indonesia Competition was held in 2018 by Yayasan Dharma Gantari (the previous license holder until 2019). 
In April 2021, Yayasan Dunia Mega Bintang announced that they will send another Miss Grand Indonesia finalist to the Miss Face of Humanity 2021. The current titleholder is Andina Julie from South Sumatra as Miss Grand Indonesia 2022.

Requirements 

From 2023, this is the list for Miss Mega Bintang Indonesia requirements:
 Female
 Minimum height: 172 cm with great proportion
 Well articulated, broad minded and ready to work
 Pageant fighters from any competition
 Ready to be famous

Titleholders 
Color keys

Titles

Miss Grand Indonesia 
The Grand Winner of Miss Grand Indonesia pageant will compete in Miss Grand International. In 2018-2019 Yayasan Dharma Gantari as National Director and 2020–present Ivan Gunawan as National Director of Miss Grand Indonesia, handpicked the representative for the Miss Grand International 2021-2022.

Before 2018, Miss Grand International licence was hold by Yayasan Puteri Indonesia (2013, 2016-2017) and El John Pageants (2014-2015). The first ever Miss Grand Indonesia was Novia Indriani Mamuaja (3rd Runner-up Puteri Indonesia 2012-2013). She competed in Miss Grand International 2013 when she got unplaced. The next year, Yayasan Puteri Indonesia lost their licence to El John Pageants. El John Pageants sent 2 representatives in 2014 and 2015 competition.

In 2014, Margenie Winarti marked as the first Miss Grand Indonesia that placed in Top 10 finalist. In 2016, the licence back to Yayasan Puteri Indonesia and Ariska Putri Pertiwi (Puteri Indonesia Perdamaian 2016) got the crown of Miss Grand International 2016 and received the Best in National Costume award. The last Puteri Indonesia that competed in Miss Grand International was Dea Goesti Rizkita when she got the Top 10 position and Best in National Costume.

Color Key

Number of wins by Province

Miss Face of Humanity Indonesia  
Since 2022, finalist of Miss Grand Indonesia will be appointed for Miss Face of Humanity beauty pageant.

1st Runner-up Miss Grand Indonesia 
This is the list of, 1st Runner-up Miss Grand Indonesia.

Gallery of winners

Miss Grand Indonesia

Before Miss Grand Indonesia

Miss Intercontinental Indonesia

Placements at International Pageants

The following are the placements of Miss Grand Indonesia titleholders for their participation at international pageants throughout the years.

 3 Placements at Miss Grand International (2020, 2021, 2022). The highest placements is Andina Julie as 2nd Runner-up Miss Grand International 2022
 1 Placement at Miss Face of Humanity (2022). The highest placement is Nadia Tjoa as Miss Face of Humanity 2022

Previous Pageant
 1 Placement at Miss Intercontinental (2021). The highest placement is Bella Aprilia Sant as Top 20 Miss Intercontinental 2021

Indonesia's Placement at Miss Grand International

Before Miss Grand Indonesia

Miss Intercontinental Indonesia 
Before 2020, Miss Intercontinental licence was hold by El John Pageants (2014-2019).

See also 
Miss Grand International
Puteri Indonesia
Puteri Indonesia Perdamaian
Miss Earth Indonesia
Putri Pariwisata Indonesia

References

External links 
 Yayasan Dunia Mega Bintang on Instagram

Beauty pageants in Indonesia
Indonesian awards
Lists of award winners
Lists of women in beauty pageants
Indonesia